Albert Capellas Herms (born 1 October 1967), is a Spanish football manager. He was most recently the manager of FC Midtjylland.

Career
Capellas was born in Avinyó, Barcelona, Catalonia. After a modest career as a player, he joined CF Gavà in 1991 as assistant manager. Capellas later joined the youth academy of FC Barcelona where he was assistant manager of FC Barcelona B from 1999 to 2003 and then became the youth coordinator at FC Barcelona.

In 2010 he went to the Netherlands to be the assistant manager of Albert 'Chapi' Ferrer at Vitesse during the 2010–2011 season. After Albert Ferrer's departure following poor results, he continued working for three more seasons at the Dutch side as the assistant coach of John van den Brom and Peter Bosz.

After leaving Vitesse in the summer of 2014, he went to Denmark to work as an assistant to Thomas Frank at Brøndby IF between 2014 and 2015. In addition, he was also the manager of the U-17 team during 2016.

In the 2016–2017 season he became an assistant of Peter Bosz in Maccabi Tel Aviv FC.

On June 6, 2017 Peter Bosz brought Albert in as part of the Borussia Dortmund coaching staff. Both would be sacked in December 2017 after a series of poor results.

In the summer of 2018, Capellas was hired as Jordi Cruyff's assistant at Chongqing Liangjiang in the Chinese Super League where he would stay until the end of the season. Working together, the two managed to save Chongqing's status in the top flight of the Chinese Super League.

Coaching career
In June 2019, he signed a contract with the Danish Football Federation to become the manager of the Denmark U21 national team. On October 16, 2020 after a 2-1 victory over Finland, Denmark qualified for the European Championship with good results.

Following the dismissal of Ronald Koeman as FC Barcelona manager and the appointment of Sergi Barjuán as interim manager, Capellas was chosen as interim manager of FC Barcelona B during Barjuan's absence.

On 24 August 2022 Capellas was named new manager of Danish Superliga side FC Midtjylland on at contract running until 2025. He was sacked on 14 March 2023 with the club in 9th place in the Danish Superliga.

Managerial statistics

References

1967 births
Living people
People from Bages
Sportspeople from the Province of Barcelona
Spanish football managers
Primera Federación managers
FC Barcelona Atlètic managers
FC Midtjylland managers